The Avalon Theatre, formerly known as Chevy Chase Theatre, is an historic structure located in the Chevy Chase neighborhood in the Northwest Quadrant of Washington, D.C. The Classical Revival building was designed by the architectural firm of Upman and Adams and completed in 1922. The Avalon is a rare example of a neighborhood movie house in Washington; it is the oldest in continuous use.  It was listed on the National Register of Historic Places in 1996.  

As of 2021, it hosts the Washington metropolitan area's third-largest commercial movie theater screen, after the National Air & Space Museum and the AFI Silver in Silver Spring, Maryland.

See also
Chevy Chase Arcade

External links

References

Cinemas and movie theaters in Washington, D.C.
Theatres completed in 1922
1922 establishments in Washington, D.C.
Neoclassical architecture in Washington, D.C.
Theatres in Washington, D.C.
Theatres on the National Register of Historic Places in Washington, D.C.
Cinema of Washington, D.C.